Viper is an unincorporated community in Perry County, Kentucky, United States. The community was so named on account of viper snakes near the original town site.

Viper has a post office with ZIP code 41774.

Notable people
Jean Ritchie, folk singer

References

Unincorporated communities in Perry County, Kentucky
Unincorporated communities in Kentucky
Coal towns in Kentucky